Year and a day can refer to:
 The year and a day rule, a period tied into various legal principles in a number of jurisdictions 
 A Year and a Day (1998 novel), by Virginia Henley 
 A Year and a Day (2004 novel), by Leslie Pietrzyk (pub. William Morrow)
 A Year and a Day (2006 novel), by Sara M. Harvey
 A poem  by Elizabeth Siddall
 "Year and a Day", a song by the Beastie Boys
 A Year and a Day, a  2005 film
 A period used in handfastings – though more from the works of Sir Walter Scott than history
 The time The Owl and the Pussycat sailed for in Edward Lear's poem of that name.
 Long term assets are considered to be those held for a year and a day.
 Pagans and secret societies often use a year and a day as a minimum period of initiation or between degrees of membership.
 A Year and a Day, a 2008 mixtape by rapper T.I.

Note: a lunar year (13 lunar months of 28 days) plus a day is a solar year (365 days). Also that 366 days would be a full year even if a leap day was included.